Yusra Alhabsyi, Bachelor of Economics (born March 14, 1979) is an Indonesian politician who currently serves as a member of the North Sulawesi parliament (North Sulawesi Regional People's Representative Council) from the National Awakening Party. In addition, Yusra has also served as Chairman of the North Sulawesi Ansor Youth Movement since 2015.

References

Footnotes

Works cited

  
 
  
 

1979 births
Living people
Indonesian people of Yemeni descent
National Awakening Party politicians
Sam Ratulangi University alumni
People from North Sulawesi